Eugnosta unifasciana is a species of moth of the family Tortricidae. It is found in Tanzania. The habitat consists of a mosaic of Brachystegia-forest and semi-evergreen coastal forest.

The wingspan is 11–14 mm. The forewings are cream with ochreous suffusion. The hindwings are light grey.

Etymology
The species name refers to the characteristic median fascia in the forewing.

References

Endemic fauna of Tanzania
Moths described in 2010
Eugnosta